The 1947 Oil Bowl was a college football postseason bowl game that featured the Saint Mary's Gaels and the Georgia Tech Yellow Jackets.

Background
In Bobby Dodd's second year as coach of the Yellow Jackets, he guided them to a 4th-place finish in the Southeastern Conference, in their fifth bowl appearance in the decade. The Gaels were going to a bowl game for the second straight year.

Game summary
The Gaels had eight passes intercepted, with W.P. McHugh returning one 73 yards for a touchdown. George Brodnax caught two touchdowns.

Aftermath
Phelan left the program the following year to become coach of the Los Angeles Dons. This was the last bowl game the Gaels participated in before the dismantlement of the football program in 2004. The Yellow Jackets went to seven bowl games in the next 10 years.

References

Oil Bowl
Georgia Tech Yellow Jackets football bowl games
Saint Mary's Gaels football bowl games
Oil Bowl
January 1947 sports events in the United States